is a Japanese singer from Tokyo who is affiliated with Newcome. Beginning her music activities as an independent musician, she was the lead vocalist of the music unit MYTH & ROID from 2015 to 2017. After leaving MYTH & ROID, she resumed activities as a solo artist, making her major debut in 2019. Her music has been featured in anime series such as Re:Zero − Starting Life in Another World, Full Dive, Overlord and Uncle from Another World.

Career
Maeshima's music activities began as a member of the band Ms. Velonica, which was active from 2012 until 2013. In 2015, she became a member of the music unit MYTH & ROID, serving as its lead vocalist until November 2017. In 2019, she released the digital single "YELLOW" under Warner Music Japan. This was followed by the release of her first solo album From Dream And You in September 2019. Her first solo single "Long shot" was released on February 24, 2021 under KADOKAWA; the title song was used as the second opening theme to the second season of the anime series Re:Zero − Starting Life in Another World, while the coupling track "Reline" was used as the main theme to the game Re:Zero: The Prophecy of the Throne. Her second single "ANSWER" was released on May 26, 2021;  the title song was used as the opening theme to the anime series  Full Dive: This Ultimate Next-Gen Full Dive RPG Is Even Shittier than Real Life!.
Her third single "No Man's Dawn" was released on July 27, 2022; the title song was used as the ending theme to the fourth season of the anime series Overlord.
Her fourth single "story" was released on August 3, 2022; the title song was used as the opening theme to the anime series Uncle from Another World.

Discography

Singles

Album

References

External links
 Official website 

1993 births
Anime musicians
Japanese women singers
Living people
Singers from Tokyo